Charles O'Rear (born 26 November 1941) is an American photographer. His image Bliss was used as the default desktop wallpaper of Microsoft's Windows XP operating system. O'Rear started his career with the daily newspapers Emporia Gazette, The Kansas City Star, and Los Angeles Times; worked for National Geographic magazine; and was part of the Environmental Protection Agency's DOCUMERICA project. He began photographing winemaking in 1978.

Since 1998 O'Rear has been associated with Corbis, a Seattle-based stock photo company owned by co-founder and chairman of Microsoft, Bill Gates. Corbis was bought by Visual China Group in 2016, who now distribute his Corbis images on Getty Images.

Early life and career
O'Rear was born in Butler, Missouri in 1941 and first handled a Brownie camera when he was 10. As a child, he wanted to be a pilot and got his license at the age of 16. He attended State Teachers College and started his career as a sports reporter for the Butler Daily Democrat. In 1961, he joined the daily newspaper Emporia Gazette as a photographer, and in 1962 The Kansas City Star as a reporter-photographer and, in 1966, he moved to Los Angeles to join as a staff photographer for the Los Angeles Times.

In 1971, National Geographic magazine hired O'Rear to document the lives of Russian villagers in Alaska who called themselves Old Believers. In 1978, the magazine sent him to Napa Valley to photograph the wine region. O'Rear became interested in wine photography and shifted his base to the valley to photograph the region. In 1985, he traveled to Indonesia for another assignment for the magazine where he carried 500 rolls of film and took 15,000 photos. O'Rear has appeared on National Geographic magazine's cover twice: once as "Bird Man" flying an ultralight aircraft and later for the other photograph shown him holding a computer chip in his hand. O'Rear had been associated with the magazine for nearly 25 years (1971 to 1995) and has photographed in 30 countries and every state in the USA. For the magazine, he photographed 25 articles ranging in topics including the Mexican Riviera, Siberia, Canada, Silicon Valley and Napa Valley. While working with National Geographic, he learned to use small strobes and taught the subject for 11 years at the Santa Fe Photographic Workshop.

From 1972 to 1975, O'Rear was part of the Environmental Protection Agency's DOCUMERICA project, aimed at "photographically documenting the subjects of environmental concern in America during the 1970s" along with 70 other photographers including Bill Strode, Danny Lyon and John H. White. O'Rear is credited with the most photographs in the final DOCUMERICA collection. In 1980, he co-founded the photo agency, Westlight, with Craig Aurness, which was acquired in 1998 by Corbis. The same year, Corbis sent O'Rear around the world for a year to photograph major wine regions.

Bliss

In January 1996, O'Rear was on his way from his home in St. Helena, California, in the Napa Valley, to visit his girlfriend, Daphne Irwin (whom he later married), in the city, as he did every Friday afternoon. He was working with Irwin on a book about the wine country.
Driving through Napa and Sonoma counties in California, he stopped and pulled off the road to photograph a green, lush hillside on the side of the highway 12/121. O'Rear took the photograph with a hand-held medium-format Mamiya RZ67 camera. He submitted the photo to Westlight under the name of Bucolic Green Hills. Westlight would be acquired by Corbis in 1998, one of the stock photography agencies that Microsoft used at the time.

Microsoft picked O'Rear's image for its new operating system Windows XP in 2001, buying all rights to it.
They offered O'Rear what he says is the second-largest payment ever made to a photographer for a single image; however, he signed a confidentiality agreement and cannot disclose the exact amount.
It has been reported to be "in the low six figures". Microsoft bought him a plane ticket to Seattle and he personally delivered the original film to their offices, as couriers and delivery services declined to ship it after becoming aware of the value of the shipment. Microsoft renamed the image to Bliss and used it as the default desktop wallpaper for Windows XP's default theme.
The image also became part of Microsoft's $200 million advertising campaign to promote their software, Yes You Can. As a result of the success of the operating system, O'Rear's photograph became one of the most viewed images in history.

The image was alleged to have been digitally manipulated to enhance its effects or even to have been a computer-generated scene, assembled using Adobe Photoshop from a number of different images. O'Rear denied the claim and reported that it was submitted to Westlight unedited. The saturated colors resulted from the use of Fujifilm's Velvia film, rather than being an alteration made by Westlight or Microsoft.

Books
O'Rear has written, produced, and photographed 10 books about wine and wine regions since 1989.
 Silicon Valley High Tech: Window to the Future. Australia: Weldon Publishing, 1985.
 Napa Valley (1989)
 Fodor's Wine Country (1995)
 Cabernet: A Photographic Journey from Vine to Wine (1998) co-authored with Michael Creedman, Foreword by Robert Mondavi
 Chardonnay: Photographs from Around the World (1999) co-authored with Michael Creedman
 Napa Valley: The Land, The Wine, The People (2001)
 Beautiful Wineries (2005) co-authored with Thom Elkjer
 Wine Places: The Land, the Wine, the People (2005) co-authored with David Furer
 Wine Across America: A Photographic Road Trip (2007) co-authored with Daphne Larkin
 Beringer's Rhine House (2009) co-authored with Daphne Larkin
 Napa Valley: The Land, The Wine, The People (2011)

References

External links

 Photographs by Charles O'Rear on Getty Images
 Photographs by Charles O'Rear owned by Visual China Group on Getty Images
 DOCUMERICA photos by Charles O'Rear on Flickr:
Amtrak
Hawaii
Southwest

1941 births
Living people
People from St. Helena, California
Photographers from Missouri
Photographers from California
People from Butler, Missouri
Stock photographers
National Geographic photographers